Wang Doin, known by her title of Princess Jeonghwa, was the illegitimate daughter of Gangjong of Goryeo and the second wife of Choe Chung-heon. According to Goryeosa, her existence can be confirmed by the record: "Choe Chung-heon accepted King Gangjong's naughty daughter as his second wife". After married, she then given title as Taekju (택주, 宅主) in 1214 who could only used for princesses.

Although she was the King's daughter, but she didn't recognized or treated like that due to her mother's status. Her father must spent years of hardship since got expelled to Ganghwa-do until his re-recognized by Choe own in 1211 at his 60 years old. Knew that the fearsome Choe was her family's enemy, she was forced to married him who 3 years older than Gangjong. After married, she lived with the pain of her paternal families, a husband who wields uncontrollable power and an attempt to kill her. Due to this, it was presumed to be the reason why she devout to Buddhist. After Choe's death, she still continued to practice the meditation, became a nun and returned to Buddhism.

References

Wang Do-in on EToday News .

Year of birth unknown
Year of death unknown
Goryeo princesses
12th-century Korean women